Talis povolnyi is a moth in the family Crambidae. It is found in Mongolia.

References

Ancylolomiini
Moths described in 1975
Moths of Asia